Sergey Erzrumyan (born 22 November 1980), is an Armenian football midfielder, currently with Armenian First League club Alashkert Martuni.

Erzrumyan played for FC SKA Rostov-on-Don in the Russian First Division during the 2002 season, scoring once.

References

External links
Sergey Erzrumyan profile, Football Federation of Armenia

1980 births
Living people
Footballers from Yerevan
Armenian footballers
Armenian expatriate footballers
Expatriate footballers in Lebanon
FC Urartu players
FC Ararat Yerevan players
FC SKA Rostov-on-Don players
FC Gandzasar Kapan players
Expatriate footballers in Russia
Armenian Premier League players
FC Alashkert players
Association football midfielders
Racing Club Beirut players
Lebanese Premier League players
Armenian expatriate sportspeople in Lebanon